The 2020 United States presidential election in Kentucky was held on Tuesday, November 3, 2020, as part of the 2020 United States presidential election in which all 50 states plus the District of Columbia participated. Kentucky voters chose electors to represent them in the Electoral College via a popular vote, pitting the Republican Party's nominee, incumbent President Donald Trump, and running mate Vice President Mike Pence against Democratic Party nominee, former Vice President Joe Biden, and his running mate California Senator Kamala Harris. Kentucky has eight electoral votes in the Electoral College.

Trump won Kentucky by a 25.9% margin in this election. Prior to the election, all 12 news organizations considered this a state Trump would win, or a safe red state. The Bluegrass State has not supported a Democratic nominee since it narrowly supported fellow Southerner Bill Clinton in 1996. Trump's overhaul of Obama-era coal emissions standards helped him win coal-industry households, once again sweeping the historically-Democratic Eastern Kentucky counties. Trump also carried 83% of White evangelical/born-again Christians, per exit polls by the Associated Press. In addition to Trump's victory in the Commonwealth, Biden became the first Democrat to win the presidency without winning Elliott County since the county was founded in 1869, as well as only the second Democrat to ever lose Elliott County in a presidential election, preceded only by Hillary Clinton four years earlier. This also marks the second consecutive election in which no county in the Eastern Kentucky Coalfield voted Democratic, albeit the first time since 2008 that any of said counties experienced a Democratic swing. Furthermore, this is the first time since 1948 that Fayette County, the second-most populous county in the state and home to the city of Lexington, voted to the left of Jefferson County, the most populous county in the state and home to the city of Louisville, in a presidential election.

Primary elections
The primary elections were originally scheduled for May 19, 2020. On March 16, they were moved to June 23 due to concerns over the COVID-19 pandemic.

Republican primary
Incumbent President Donald Trump ran unopposed in the Republican primary. The state has 46 delegates to the 2020 Republican National Convention.

Democratic primary

General election

Predictions

Polling

Graphical summary

Aggregate polls

Polls

Donald Trump vs. Pete Buttigieg

Donald Trump vs. Bernie Sanders

Donald Trump vs. Elizabeth Warren

Results

Statewide results

By county

By congressional district
Trump won 5 of 6 congressional districts.

See also
 United States presidential elections in Kentucky
 2020 Kentucky elections
 2020 United States presidential election
 2020 Democratic Party presidential primaries
 2020 Republican Party presidential primaries
 2020 United States elections

Notes

Partisan clients

References

Further reading

External links
 
 
  (State affiliate of the U.S. League of Women Voters)
 

Kentucky
2020
Presidential